Randall David Johnson (born September 10, 1963), nicknamed "The Big Unit", is an American photographer and former professional baseball pitcher who played 22 seasons in Major League Baseball (1988–2009) for six teams, primarily the Seattle Mariners and Arizona Diamondbacks.

At , Johnson was the tallest player in MLB history when he entered the league: a factor that contributed to his extremely intimidating persona and pitching style. He is particularly known for his overpowering fastball and devastating slider, a combination which remained effective throughout his lengthy career. While he initially struggled with control in his early seasons, Johnson subsequently established himself as one of the most dominant pitchers of his era, leading his league in strikeouts nine times, and in earned run average, winning percentage, and complete games four times each. Along with teammate Curt Schilling, Johnson was one of two World Series Most Valuable Players in 2001; in the Series, Johnson won three games and led the Arizona Diamondbacks to a World Series victory over the New York Yankees in the fourth season of the team's existence. He won the pitching Triple Crown in 2002.

Johnson's 303 career victories are the fifth-most by a left-hander in MLB history, while his 4,875 strikeouts place him second all time behind Nolan Ryan and first among left-handers. Johnson is a ten-time All-Star, won the Cy Young Award five times, and is one of only two pitchers (the other is Greg Maddux) to win the award in four consecutive seasons (1999–2002). Johnson won Cy Young Awards in both leagues. He is also one of five pitchers to pitch no-hitters in both leagues, and one of 20 pitchers in history to record a win against all 30 MLB franchises.

Johnson enjoyed a career longevity uncommon to pitchers, with his signature fastball-slider combination remaining effective well into his 40s.  Four of his six 300-strikeout seasons occurred after his 35th birthday.  On May 18, 2004, at 40 years old, he threw Major League Baseball's 17th perfect game, and remains the oldest pitcher to accomplish this feat.  Johnson ultimately retired at the age of 46, and was elected to the Baseball Hall of Fame in 2015, his first year of eligibility. He is the first member of the Hall to be depicted in a Diamondbacks uniform on his plaque.

Early life
Johnson was born in the San Francisco Bay Area suburb of Walnut Creek, California, to Carol Hannah and Rollen Charles "Bud" Johnson. By the time he entered Livermore High School, he was a star in baseball and basketball. In 1982, as a senior, he struck out 121 batters in 66 innings, and threw a perfect game in his last high school start.

College career
Johnson accepted a full athletic scholarship to play baseball for the University of Southern California. While at USC, he also played two years of basketball. He was a starter at USC (where he was a teammate of Mark McGwire) under coach Rod Dedeaux, but often exhibited control problems.

Professional career

Drafts and minor leagues
After high school, Johnson was selected by the Atlanta Braves in the 4th round of the 1982 MLB draft, but did not sign. He was drafted by the Montreal Expos in the second round of the 1985 Major League Baseball draft. In 1985, he pitched for the Jamestown Expos of the New York-Pennsylvania League. In 1986, he pitched for the West Palm Beach Expos of the Florida State League. In 1987, he pitched for the Jacksonville Expos of the Southern League. In 1988, he pitched for the Indianapolis Indians of the American Association.

Montreal Expos (1988–1989)
He made his major league debut on September 15, 1988, against the Pittsburgh Pirates, earning a 9–4 victory with a five-inning outing in which he gave up two runs with five strikeouts; his first victim was Orestes Destrade in the second inning. Johnson posted a record of 3–0 with a 2.42 earned run average (ERA) in four games in 1988, but 1989 saw him slip to an 0–4 mark with a 6.67 ERA in seven games through May 7. On May 25, 1989 he was traded to the Seattle Mariners in a trade involving five pitchers that brought Mark Langston to Montreal. In 11 total games played with the Expos, he went 3–4 with a 4.69 ERA and one complete game in 55.2 innings with 51 strikeouts and 33 walks.

Seattle Mariners (1989–1998)

1989–1992
After joining the Mariners during the 1989 season, Johnson led the American League in walks for three consecutive seasons (1990–1992), and hit batsmen in 1992 and 1993. In July 1991, facing the Milwaukee Brewers, the erratic Johnson allowed 4 runs on 1 hit, thanks to 10 walks in 4 innings. A month later, a 9th-inning single cost him a no-hitter against the Oakland Athletics. Johnson suffered another 10-walk, 4-inning start in 1992.

His untapped talent was explosive: In 1990, Johnson became the first left-hander to strike out Wade Boggs three times in one game, and a no-hitter against the Detroit Tigers attested to his potential. Johnson credits a session with Nolan Ryan late in the 1992 season with helping him take his career to the next level; Ryan has said that he appreciated Johnson's talent and did not want to see him take as long to figure certain things out as he had taken. Ryan recommended a slight change in his delivery; before the meeting, Johnson would land on the heel of his foot after delivering a pitch, and he therefore usually landed offline from home plate. Ryan suggested that he land on the ball of his foot, and almost immediately, he began finding the strike zone more consistently. In a September 27, 1992, game against the Texas Rangers, with Ryan the opposing starting pitcher, Johnson struck out 18 batters in eight innings while throwing 160 pitches, a pitch count that has not been reached in an MLB game since. It was during the 1992 off-season when Johnson returned home for Christmas only to lose his father to an  aortic aneurysm. His father's death was so devastating that he decided to quit baseball, only to have his mother convince him otherwise.

1993
Johnson broke out in 1993, posting a 19–8 record, 3.24 ERA, his first of six 300-plus strikeout seasons (308), and he was also the first Seattle Mariners pitcher to reach 300 strikeouts in a single season. In May 1993, Johnson again lost a no-hitter to a 9th-inning single; again, the opponent was the Oakland Athletics. He also recorded his 1,000th career strikeout against the Minnesota Twins' Chuck Knoblauch. Prior to the trade deadline, Johnson was nearly dealt to the Toronto Blue Jays for Steve Karsay and Mike Timlin. Toronto general manager Pat Gillick had two separate transactions on the table including the one for Johnson with Seattle general manager Woody Woodward and one for Rickey Henderson with Oakland general manager Sandy Alderson. When Gillick was unable to contact Woodward he agreed to utilize the deal with Alderson. When Woodward returned Gillick's call he said he would agree to the deal for Johnson. However, Gillick gave his word to Alderson even though the deal had not been finalized. At the 1993 All-Star Game in Baltimore, Maryland, in a famous incident, Johnson threw a fastball over the head of Philadelphia Phillies first baseman John Kruk. On October 3, Johnson entered the final game of the season as a defensive substitution, replacing Brian Turang in left field. This made him the tallest player to play the field in baseball history.

1995
After pitching well in the strike-shortened 1994 season, Johnson won the American League Cy Young Award in 1995 with an 18–2 record, 2.48 ERA and 294 strikeouts. His .900 winning percentage was the second highest in AL history, behind Johnny Allen, who had gone 15–1 for the Cleveland Indians in 1937. Johnson became the first regular starting pitcher in history to strike out more than a third of all batters faced. He also became the first Seattle Mariners pitcher to win the Cy Young Award, and the only one until Félix Hernández took home the honor in 2010. Johnson capped the Mariners' late-season comeback by pitching a three-hitter in the AL West's one-game playoff, crushing the California Angels' hopes with 12 strikeouts. Thus unable to start in the 5-game ALDS series against the Yankees until the third game, Johnson watched as New York took a 2–0 series lead. He defeated the Yankees in Game 3 with 10 strikeouts in seven innings.

When the series went the full five games, the Mariners having come back from an 2-0 deficit to win both games at the Kingdome, Johnson made a dramatic relief appearance in the series final, Game 5, on only one day's rest. Entering a 4–4 game in the ninth inning, Johnson pitched the 9th, 10th, and 11th innings. He allowed one run, struck out six, and held on for the series-ending win in Seattle's dramatic comeback.

1996−1998
Johnson was sidelined throughout much of the 1996 season with a back injury, but he rebounded in 1997 with a 20–4 record, 291 strikeouts, and a 2.28 ERA (his personal best). Between May 1994 and October 1997, Johnson had gone 53–9, including a 16–0 streak that fell one short of the AL record. Johnson had two 19-strikeout starts in 1997, on June 24 and August 8.

Another colorful All-Star Game moment proceeded in the 1997 edition involving former Expos teammate Larry Walker, at that point with the Colorado Rockies.   When Johnson had started an interleague game versus the Rockies on June 12, Walker chose not to play, explaining that "I faced Randy one time in spring training and he almost killed me."  In the All-Star Game, Walker batted against Johnson, who theatrically threw over his head.  Ever adaptable, Walker placed his batting helmet backwards and switched sides in the batters' box to stand right-handed for one pitch.  He ended the at bat by drawing a walk.  The incident momentarily drew mirth and laughter from players in both dugouts, fans and announcers, and, of course, comparisons to the at bat with Kruk in the 1993 All-Star Game.  In spite of garnering a reputation of avoiding Johnson, Walker batted .393 (11 hits in 28 at bats) against him in his career, nearly double the rate of all left-handed batters at .199. When the 1998 season began, Johnson was upset the Mariners would not offer him a contract extension, given his contract was expiring after the season. Though the Mariners initially wanted to keep Johnson, turning down a trade offer from the Los Angeles Dodgers, they fell out of contention, going 8–20 in June. Minutes before the non-waiver trade deadline, on July 31, the Mariners traded Johnson to the Houston Astros for three minor leaguers: Freddy García, Carlos Guillén, and John Halama.

Houston Astros (1998)
In 11 regular-season starts with the Astros, Johnson posted a 10–1 record, a 1.28 ERA, and 116 strikeouts in  innings, and pitched four shutouts. Johnson finished 7th in the National League Cy Young Award voting, despite pitching only two months in the league, and helped Houston win their second straight National League Central division title. During the playoffs, however, the Astros lost the 1998 NLDS to the San Diego Padres, 3–1. Johnson started Games 1 and 4, both losses. He only gave up three earned runs combined in the two games, but received only one run in support (in Game 4).

Arizona Diamondbacks (1999–2004)
Johnson agreed to a four-year contract, with an option for a fifth year, for $52.4 million, with the Arizona Diamondbacks, a second-year franchise. Johnson led the team to the playoffs that year on the strength of a 17–9 record and 2.48 ERA with 364 strikeouts, leading the majors in innings, complete games, and strikeouts. Johnson won the 1999 NL Cy Young Award and Warren Spahn Award as the best left-handed pitcher in MLB. Johnson became the third pitcher in history, after Gaylord Perry and Pedro Martínez, to win the Cy Young Award in both the American and National Leagues; Martínez won the AL Cy Young in the same season that Johnson won its NL counterpart. Johnson finished 2000 with 19 wins, 347 strikeouts and a 2.64 ERA, and won his second consecutive NL Cy Young Award and Warren Spahn Award. The Diamondbacks acquired Curt Schilling from the Philadelphia Phillies in July 2000, and the two aces anchored the Diamondbacks rotation.

In the fourth year of the franchise's existence, Johnson and Schilling carried the Arizona Diamondbacks to their first World Series appearance and victory in 2001 against the New York Yankees. Johnson and Schilling shared the World Series Most Valuable Player Award, the Babe Ruth Award, and were named Sports Illustrated magazine's 2001 "Sportsmen of the Year." For the first of two consecutive seasons, Johnson and Schilling finished 1–2 in the Cy Young balloting. Johnson also won his third consecutive Warren Spahn Award. Johnson's performance was particularly dominating, striking out 11 in a 3-hit shutout in Game 2, pitching seven innings for the victory in Game 6 and then coming on in relief the following day to pick up the win in Game 7. Of Arizona's eleven post-season wins in 2001, Johnson had five. He is also the last pitcher to win 3 games in a single World Series. Johnson's Game 7 relief appearance was his second of the 2001 season; on July 19, a game against the Padres was delayed by two electrical explosions in Qualcomm Stadium. When the game resumed the following day, Johnson stepped in as the new pitcher and racked up 16 strikeouts in seven innings, technically setting the record for the most strikeouts in a relief stint.

In a freak accident on March 24, 2001, at Tucson Electric Park, during the 7th inning of a spring training game against the San Francisco Giants, Johnson threw a fastball to Calvin Murray that struck and killed a dove. The ball was ruled dead, and it was ruled "no pitch". The event was not unique in baseball history, but it became one of Johnson's most-remembered baseball moments; a news story 15 years later remarked, "the event remains iconic, and the Big Unit says he gets asked about the incident nearly as much as he does about winning the World Series later that year with the Arizona Diamondbacks".

Johnson struck out 20 batters in a game on May 8, 2001, against the Cincinnati Reds. Johnson recorded all 20 strikeouts in the first nine innings, but because the game went into extra innings, it was not categorized by MLB as an "official" 20-strikeout game. On August 23, 2001, Johnson struck out three batters on nine pitches in the 6th inning of a 5–1 loss to the Pittsburgh Pirates, becoming the 30th pitcher in major league history to pitch an immaculate inning. Johnson's 2001 season was the 2nd time in MLB history where a starting pitcher had more than twice as many strikeouts in a season (372) as hits allowed (181) (first accomplished by Pedro Martinez in the 2000 season with 284 strikeouts and 128 hits and later also accomplished by Max Scherzer in 2017, and both Gerrit Cole and Justin Verlander in 2019).

In 2002, Johnson won the pitching Triple Crown, leading the NL in wins, ERA, and strikeouts, and was voted his fourth consecutive Cy Young and Warren Spahn Awards. It was Johnson's fourth consecutive 300-strikeout season with the Diamondbacks, and fifth consecutive overall, extending his own MLB record from the previous season in which he set the record for the most consecutive seasons with 300 or more strikeouts in a season by a pitcher. He also became the first pitcher in baseball history to post a 24–5 record.

Johnson spent the majority of the 2003 season on the disabled list and was ineffective in the few injury-hampered starts he did make. He hit the only home run of his career on September 19, 2003, against the Milwaukee Brewers. Johnson was a .125 hitter over 625 career at-bats.

Perfect game

On May 18, 2004, Johnson pitched the 17th perfect game in MLB history. At 40 years of age, he was the oldest pitcher to accomplish this feat. Johnson had 13 strikeouts on his way to a 2–0 victory against the Atlanta Braves. The perfect game made him the fifth pitcher in Major League history (after Cy Young, Jim Bunning, Nolan Ryan, and Hideo Nomo) to pitch a no-hitter in both leagues. He also became the fifth pitcher in Major League history to throw both a no-hitter and a perfect game in his career (after Young, Bunning, Addie Joss, and Sandy Koufax; since Johnson, Mark Buehrle and Roy Halladay have joined this group). Johnson struck out Jeff Cirillo of the San Diego Padres on June 29, 2004, to become only the fourth MLB player to reach 4,000 strikeouts in a career.

He finished the 2004 season with a 16–14 record, though his poor record was partially due to a lack of run support as his ERA that year was 2.60. Johnson led the major leagues in strikeouts (with 290). In the games where Arizona scored three or more runs, Johnson was 13–2. As his team only won 51 games that year, his ratio of winning 31.3% of his team's games was the highest for any starting pitcher since Steve Carlton in 1972 (who won 27 of the Phillies' 59 wins for an all-time record ratio of 45.8%).

New York Yankees (2005–2006)

The Diamondbacks traded Johnson to the New York Yankees for Javier Vázquez, Brad Halsey, Dioner Navarro, and cash in January 2005. Johnson pitched Opening Day for the Yankees on April 3, 2005, against the Boston Red Sox. Johnson was inconsistent through 2005, allowing 32 home runs; however, he regained his dominance in late 2005. He was 5–0 against the Yankees' division rival Red Sox and finished the season 17–8 with a 3.79 ERA, and was second in the AL with 211 strikeouts.

In 2005, The Sporting News published an update of their 1999 book Baseball's 100 Greatest Players. Johnson did not make the original edition, but for the 2005 update, with his career totals considerably higher and his 2001 World Championship season taken into account, he was ranked at Number 60.

Johnson was a disappointment in Game 3 of the 2005 Division Series against the Los Angeles Angels of Anaheim, allowing 5 runs on 2 home runs in 3 innings. In Game 5 in Anaheim, Johnson made an effective relief appearance after Mike Mussina gave up 5 runs and 6 hits to give the Angels a 5–2 lead, but the Yankees were unable to come back in the series.

After an inconclusive year in pinstripes, New York fans hoped that Johnson would return to his dominant style in his second Yankee season. Johnson began 2006 well, but then he struggled to find form. In between some impressive performances, he allowed 5 or more runs in 7 of his first 18 starts for the season. Johnson was more effective in the second half. Johnson finished the season with a 17–11 record, a subpar 5.00 ERA with 172 strikeouts. It was revealed at the end of the 2006 season that a herniated disc in Johnson's back had been stiffening him and it was only in his second to last start of the season that he decided to get it checked. This exposure caused him to miss his last start of 2006. After being given epidural anesthesia and a few bullpen sessions he was cleared to start in game 3 of the ALDS, however he gave up 5 runs in 5 innings.

Second stint with the Arizona Diamondbacks (2007–2008)

In January 2007, the Yankees traded Johnson back to the Diamondbacks, almost two years to the day that Arizona had traded him to New York, for a package of Luis Vizcaíno, Alberto González, Steven Jackson, and Ross Ohlendorf. The Yankees' decision to trade Johnson was primarily based on a pre-season conversation he had with Yankees General Manager Brian Cashman about the importance of being closer to his family in Phoenix after the death of his brother.

Johnson missed most of April, rehabilitating his injured back before returning on April 24, 2007. Johnson allowed six runs in 5 innings and took the loss, but struck out seven. He returned to form, and by his tenth start of the season was among the NL's top ten strikeout pitchers. But on July 3, his surgically repaired disc from the previous season was reinjured. Johnson had season-ending surgery on the same disc, this time removing it completely. Reporting that the procedure went "a little better than expected", Arizona hoped that Johnson would be ready for the 2008 season.

Johnson made his season debut on April 14, 2008, against the San Francisco Giants at AT&T Park eight months following his back surgery. On June 3, 2008, Johnson struck out Mike Cameron of the Milwaukee Brewers for career strikeout number 4,673. With this strikeout Johnson surpassed Roger Clemens for the number two spot on the all-time strikeout leaders list. Johnson struck out 8 in the game but could not get the win as the Diamondbacks lost 7–1.

Johnson got his 4,700th career strikeout on July 6, 2008. On July 27, 2008, Fred Lewis became the first left-handed batter to get four hits against Johnson in a game. In the first at-bat in this game, a fog horn went off as Johnson was releasing his pitch, causing him to throw an eephus which fell for a strike. He finished the season with an 11–10 record and an ERA of 3.91, recording his 100th career complete game in a 2–1 victory over the Colorado Rockies.

San Francisco Giants (2009)

On December 26, 2008, Johnson signed a one-year deal with the San Francisco Giants for a reported $8 million, with a possible $2.5 million in performance bonuses and another $2.5 million in award bonuses. Johnson became the 24th pitcher to reach 300 wins, beating the Washington Nationals (the team that he first played for when they were known as the Montreal Expos) on June 4 at Nationals Park in Washington, D.C. He became the seventh left-handed pitcher to achieve the 300-win milestone and the fifth pitcher in the last 50 years to get his 299th and 300th win in consecutive starts, joining Warren Spahn, Steve Carlton, Gaylord Perry, and Tom Seaver. Johnson was placed on the 60-day disabled list with a torn rotator cuff in his throwing shoulder on July 28, 2009. Johnson was activated by the Giants on September 16, 2009, and assigned to the Giants bullpen. On September 19, 2009, Johnson made his first relief appearance in 4 years, facing the Los Angeles Dodgers for 3 batters. At age 46, he was at the time the second oldest player in Major League Baseball, trailing only Jamie Moyer.

Retirement

On January 5, 2010, he announced his retirement from professional baseball. The Mariners invited Johnson to throw out the ceremonial first pitch at the Seattle Mariners home opener at Safeco Field on April 12, 2010, and inducted Johnson into the Mariners Hall of Fame on January 17, 2012. The Diamondbacks invited Johnson and former teammate Curt Schilling to both throw out the ceremonial first pitches for the Arizona Diamondbacks' recognition of the 10th anniversary of the 2001 World Series team that defeated the New York Yankees.

Johnson was selected to the Baseball Hall of Fame in his first year of eligibility in 2015. The Diamondbacks retired his number on August 8, 2015. At the retirement ceremony, Johnson was presented with a replica of the drum set used by Neil Peart, drummer for the Canadian band Rush, during their 30th anniversary tour.

Pitching style
His signature pitch was a slider that broke down and away from left-handed hitters and down and in to right-handed hitters. The effectiveness of the pitch is marked by its velocity being in the low 90s along with tight late break; hitters often believed they were thrown a fastball until the ball broke just before it crossed home plate. Right-handed hitters have swung through and missed sliders that nearly hit their back foot. Johnson dubbed his slider "Mr. Snappy". Johnson also threw a split-finger fastball that behaved like a change-up, and a sinker to induce ground-ball outs. In a June 27, 2012, appearance on The Dan Patrick Show, Adam Dunn (a left-handed batter) was asked who the best pitcher he faced was. "Honestly, Randy Johnson when he was good. It's hopeless. It's like a hopeless feeling. The first time you face him you feel like he's going to hit you right in the back of the neck when he throws it, like every pitch is going to hit you in the back of the neck. And it ends up down and away for a strike and you just have to trust it's going to be a strike, and heaven forbid he doesn't lose one out there and heaven forbid, there goes your cheek."

Accomplishments

 Pitched his first no-hitter for Seattle (their first) on June 2, 1990, against Detroit
 10-time All-Star (1990, 1993–1995, 1997, 1999–2002, 2004)
 Led the league in strikeouts nine times (1992–1995, 1999–2002, 2004)
 Led the league in ERA four times (1995, 1999, 2001, 2002)
 Won 3 games in a single World Series (2001)
 Triple crown (2002)
 5-time Cy Young Award winner (1995, 1999–2002)
 4-time Warren Spahn Award winner (1999–2002)
 Holds the record for most strikeouts in a relief appearance (16 against San Diego on July 18, 2001)
 Holds the record for highest single-season and career strikeout per 9 innings ratio: 13.41 and 10.61
 Holds the record for most games with 11, 12, 13, 14, 15 or more strikeouts
 World Series co-MVP (Curt Schilling, 2001)
 Co-winner of the Babe Ruth Award (Curt Schilling, 2001)
 Pitched a perfect game for Arizona against Atlanta (May 18, 2004) – oldest pitcher to do so in major-league history
 Collected his 300th win in a 5–1 victory against the Washington Nationals on June 4, 2009
Sports Illustrated MLB All-Decade Team (2009)
Has defeated every major-league team at least once
 Most strikeouts in a game by a left-handed pitcher, struck out 20 batters on May 8, 2001, against Cincinnati Reds (note: Johnson collected his 20th strikeout in the ninth inning of the game, but the game entered extra innings. Although he did not pitch in the 10th inning, by rule Johnson is not eligible to share the single-game strikeout record for a nine inning game.)
 Set American League record for strikeouts in a nine-inning game by a left-handed pitcher with 19 against the Oakland Athletics and later the Chicago White Sox in 1997
 Won 16 consecutive decisions from 1995 to 1997
4,875 strikeouts, most all-time for left-handed pitcher; 2nd most ever (Nolan Ryan, 5,714)
 Named to the Mariners Hall of Fame
 Pitched two immaculate innings (September 2, 1998, against the Atlanta Braves and August 23, 2001, against the Pittsburgh Pirates)
 Johnson was elected to the National Baseball Hall of Fame on 97.3% of the vote on January 6, 2015, third-highest percentage of all time for pitchers.
 Johnson was formally inducted to the National Baseball Hall of Fame on July 26, 2015, in Cooperstown, N.Y.

Personal life
Johnson has four children with his wife Lisa: Sammy (born 1994), Tanner (born 1996), Willow (born 1998), and Alexandria (born 1999). He also has a daughter from a previous relationship, Heather Renee Roszell (born 1989). He is a resident of Paradise Valley, Arizona.

Since retiring from baseball, Johnson has pursued a second career as a photographer.

In January 2015, Johnson was named a Special Assistant to the team president of the Arizona Diamondbacks, Derrick Hall.

Johnson has participated in over 40 trips with the United Service Organizations. He also supports initiatives to fight homelessness. In recognition of all his charitable efforts, he was the Hall of Fame recipient of the Bob Feller Act of Valor Award in 2019.

"Big Unit" nickname
During batting practice in 1988, the  Johnson, then with the Montreal Expos, collided head-first with outfielder Tim Raines, prompting his teammate to exclaim, "Damn! You're a big unit!"  The nickname stuck.

Throughout much of his career, Johnson held the title of tallest player in MLB history. Former pitchers Eric Hillman, Andrew Sisco, Andrew Brackman, and Chris Young have also been measured at 6'10".

Acting career
Johnson guest-starred in The Simpsons episode "Bart Has Two Mommies", which aired on March 19, 2006. Johnson appeared in the movie Little Big League, playing himself.

Johnson appeared in a Just for Men commercial where he had a grey beard and his neighbors told him "Your beard is weird." Johnson also appeared in a Right Guard commercial where he fired dodgeballs at Kyle Brandt, who represented odor. Johnson also appeared in several commercials for Nike in 1998. The spots comedically portrayed him taking batting practice (swinging ineptly at balls from a pitching machine) in his hope that he would break Roger Maris's then-single-season record for home runs. He made a cameo appearance in a commercial for MLB 2K9 with teammate Tim Lincecum. Johnson made an appearance in a GEICO insurance commercial. In 2012, he appeared in a TV ad for Pepsi Max. In 2016, Johnson appeared in a TV ad for the Mini Clubman. In 2022, Johnson appeared with his former teammates Ken Griffey Jr. and Alex Rodriguez as well as Hall of Famer David Ortiz in a commercial for the streaming service DirecTV Stream parodying Ghostbusters, as the group (titled Goatbusters) battles a giant Mr. Redlegs destroying a baseball stadium.

Johnson has been featured as a playable character in various Backyard Baseball games.

Johnson appeared in the episode "Control" on Franklin & Bash as himself.

See also

 300-win club
 3,000 strikeout club
 Houston Astros award winners and league leaders
 List of Arizona Diamondbacks team records
 List of Major League Baseball career bases on balls allowed leaders
 List of Major League Baseball career games started leaders
 List of Major League Baseball career hit batsmen leaders
 List of Major League Baseball career innings pitched leaders
 List of Major League Baseball career strikeout leaders
 List of Major League Baseball career WHIP leaders
 List of Major League Baseball career wins leaders
 List of Major League Baseball individual streaks
 List of Major League Baseball no-hitters
 List of Major League Baseball single-game strikeout leaders
 List of Seattle Mariners team records
 Major League Baseball titles leaders
 Perfect game
 Seattle Mariners award winners and league leaders

References

External links

Randy Johnson at SABR Baseball BioProject
Randy Johnson at Baseball Almanac

Randy Johnson: Countdown to 300 Wins
Randy Johnson Video on ESPN Video Archive
Randy Johnson Video on FoxSports Video Archive
Box score of Johnson's perfect game
CBS Player Page

1963 births
Living people
American people of Swedish descent
American people of German descent
American people of Canadian descent
American expatriate baseball players in Canada
American League All-Stars
American League ERA champions
American League strikeout champions
American photographers
Arizona Diamondbacks players
Baseball players from California
Christians from California
Cy Young Award winners
El Paso Diablos players
Everett AquaSox players
Houston Astros players
Indianapolis Indians players
Jacksonville Expos players
Jamestown Expos players
Lancaster JetHawks players
Major League Baseball pitchers
Major League Baseball pitchers who have pitched a perfect game
Major League Baseball players with retired numbers
Montreal Expos players
National Baseball Hall of Fame inductees
National League All-Stars
National League ERA champions
National League Pitching Triple Crown winners
National League strikeout champions
National League wins champions
New York Yankees players
San Francisco Giants players
Seattle Mariners players
Sportspeople from Walnut Creek, California
Tucson Sidewinders players
USC Trojans baseball players
USC Trojans men's basketball players
Visalia Oaks players
West Palm Beach Expos players
World Series Most Valuable Player Award winners
Anchorage Glacier Pilots players